Kapandriti is a town in the north of East Attica in Greece. Since the 2011 local government reform it is part of the municipality Oropos, of which it is a municipal unit. The municipal unit has an area of 36.789 km2. It is part of Athens metropolitan area.

Kapandriti is situated east of the Parnitha mountains and north of the Marathon Reservoir. It is 10 km northwest of Marathon and 29 km northeast of Athens city center. Motorway 1 (Athens - Thessaloniki) passes west of the town. Besides the main town, the community Kapandriti also contains the villages Mikrochori (pop. 578) and Agioi Anargyroi (276).

Historical population

Kapandriti has historically been an Arvanite settlement.

See also

List of municipalities of Attica

References

External links
GTP Travel Pages (Community)

Oropos
Populated places in East Attica

Arvanite settlements